The 2016 Swedish Open was a tennis tournament played on outdoor clay courts as part of the ATP World Tour 250 Series of the 2016 ATP World Tour and as part of the International Series on the 2016 WTA Tour. It took place in Båstad, Sweden, from 11 through 17 July 2016 for the men's tournament, and from 18 through 24 July 2016 for the women's tournament. It was also known as the 2016 SkiStar Swedish Open for the men and the 2016 Ericsson Open for the women for sponsorship reasons. It was the 69th edition of the event for the men and the 8th edition for the women.

Points and prize money

Point distribution

Prize money 

1 Qualifiers prize money is also the Round of 32 prize money
* per team

ATP singles main-draw entrants

Seeds 

 1 Rankings are as of June 27, 2016

Other entrants 
The following players received wildcards into the singles main draw:
  Isak Arvidsson 
  Fred Simonsson 
  Carl Söderlund

The following players received entry from the qualifying draw:
  Calvin Hemery
  Henri Laaksonen
  Tristan Lamasine
  Christian Lindell

Withdrawals 
Before the tournament
  Rogério Dutra Silva →replaced by   Michael Berrer
  Teymuraz Gabashvili →replaced by  Roberto Carballés Baena
  Filip Krajinović →replaced by   Dustin Brown
  Paolo Lorenzi →replaced by  Elias Ymer
  Diego Schwartzman →replaced by  Marco Trungelliti

ATP doubles main-draw entrants

Seeds 

 Rankings are as of June 27, 2016

Other entrants 
The following pairs received wildcards into the doubles main draw:
  Isak Arvidsson /  Fred Simonsson 
  Markus Eriksson /  Milos Sekulic

The following pair received entry as alternates:
  Roberto Carballés Baena /  Taro Daniel

Withdrawals 
Before the tournament
  Diego Schwartzman

WTA singles main-draw entrants

Seeds 

 1 Rankings are as of July 11, 2016

Other entrants 
The following players received wildcards into the singles main draw:
  Susanne Celik 
  Elizaveta Kulichkova 
  Cornelia Lister
  Rebecca Peterson

The following players received entry from the qualifying draw:
  Jana Čepelová 
  Lucie Hradecká 
  Kateryna Kozlova
  Aleksandra Krunić
  Kateřina Siniaková
  Sara Sorribes Tormo

The following player received entry as a special exempt:
  Viktorija Golubic

Withdrawals
Before the tournament
  Anna-Lena Friedsam  → replaced by  Anett Kontaveit
  Caroline Garcia  → replaced by  Sorana Cîrstea
  Pauline Parmentier  → replaced by  Aliaksandra Sasnovich

During the tournament
  Angelique Kerber (Left elbow injury)

Retirements
  Julia Görges (Left hip injury)
  Yaroslava Shvedova (Mid-back injury)

WTA doubles main-draw entrants

Seeds 

 1 Rankings are as of July 11, 2016

Other entrants 
The following pairs received wildcards into the doubles main draw:
  Susanne Celik /  Rebecca Peterson 
  Cornelia Lister /  Anastasija Sevastova

Withdrawals 
During the tournament
  Yaroslava Shvedova (Mid-back Injury)

Champions

Men's singles 

  Albert Ramos Viñolas def.  Fernando Verdasco, 6–3, 6–4

Women's singles 

  Laura Siegemund def.  Kateřina Siniaková, 7–5, 6–1

Men's doubles 

  Marcel Granollers /  David Marrero def.  Marcus Daniell /  Marcelo Demoliner, 6–2, 6–3

Women's doubles 

  Andreea Mitu /  Alicja Rosolska def.  Lesley Kerkhove /  Lidziya Marozava, 6–3, 7–5

References

External links 

 

Swedish Open
Swedish Open
Swedish Open
Swedish Open
July 2016 sports events in Europe